The 2005 season was the ninth season in D.C. United history, as well as their ninth season in Major League Soccer, the top tier of American soccer. The season covers the period from November 15, 2004 through October 30, 2005.

Under Piotr Nowak's tenure as head coach, this was the first and only season where he did not lead D.C. United to a trophy of any kind. D.C. United entered the season as the defending MLS Cup champions defeating Kansas City Wizards 3–2 in last season's championship. During Nowak's second season as head coach, he led the team to a slightly better regular season record, finishing third in the overall standings.

D.C. United made their first appearance in the CONCACAF Champions' Cup (now Champions League) for the first time in three years, earning qualification through winning the 2004 MLS Cup championship. In the continental tournament, D.C. United were the only American club to reach the semifinals of the tournament before losing to Mexico's UNAM Pumas 6–1 on aggregate.

In other external competitions, United finished as runners-up in the preseason Carolina Challenge Cup, reached the quarterfinals of the U.S. Open Cup and won the Atlantic Cup rivalry series against MetroStars.

Background 

D.C. United entered the 2005 season as the defending MLS Cup champions, earning their first league championship since 1999. During the 2004 MLS regular season, United finished second in the Eastern Conference table and fourth in the overall regular standings. Their playoff run included a 4–0 aggregate series victory over their Atlantic Cup rivals, MetroStars in the conference semifinals. In the conference final, United defeated the Eastern Conference regular season champions, New England Revolution in a penalty shoot-out, after a 3–3 draw in regulation and extra time. Their playoff campaign culminated in MLS Cup 2004 defeating Kansas City Wizards 3–2 in the final.

Review

Match results

Legend

Carolina Challenge Cup

CONCACAF Champions' Cup

Major League Soccer

Regular season 

Regular season results source

Playoffs

U.S. Open Cup

Copa Sudamericana

League standings

Conference 

1Earns top-seed in MLS Cup Playoffs

Overall 

Notes
Note 1: The San Jose Earthquakes earn the top-seed in the Western Conference bracket of the MLS Cup Playoffs.
Note 2: The Columbus Crew earn the top-seed in the Eastern Conference bracket of the MLS Cup Playoffs.

Player details 
Sources:

|}

Transfers 
All transactions sourced to:

In

Out

References 

2005
Dc United
Dc United
2005 in sports in Washington, D.C.